Darke is a surname. Notable people with the surname include:
 Francis Nicholson Darke (1863–1940),  leading citizen of Regina, Saskatchewan, Canada
 Harold Darke (1888–1976), composer and organist
 Ian Darke, football and boxing commentator
 Jack Darke (–1897), a miller who spent his later life in the town of Gold Rush in Queensland, Australia
 John Charles Darke (1806–1844), Surveyor and explorer in Van Diemen's Land (now Tasmania ) and South Australia
 Nick Darke (1948–2005), playwright
 Robert Darke (1876–1961), English cricketer
 Richard Darke (1970–Present), Fence man
 General William Darke (1736–1801), American soldier
 William Wedge Darke (1810–1890),  colonist and surveyor

Fictional characters:
 Sebastian Darke, the eponymous hero of a series of children's novels written by British author Philip Caveney